Suda  is a ward number 7 of Bedkot Municipality in Kanchanpur District in  Sudurpashchim Province of south-western Nepal. At the time of the 1991 Nepal census it had a population of 12,948 people living in 1947 individual households.
<villages>

References

Populated places in Kanchanpur District